The Goodman Building is a late Victorian style historic commerce building in downtown Austin, Texas. It was constructed as a grocery in the mid-1880s to serve Austinites northwest of the Texas State Capitol. Today it serves as a state government adjunct office. A local bar, "The Cloak Room," occupies the basement and is a favorite for government employees. It is located at 202 W. 13th Street. The building was added to the National Register of Historic Places in 1973.

Texas Historical Commission Marker Text
Constructed in the 1880s for Joseph Goodman, grocer in this block 1877–1924. Jacob Bickler's German and English academy, elite preparatory school, was on upper floor 1892–1896. Building is noted for rare brick work, ornamental iron.

Gallery

References

External links

Buildings and structures in Austin, Texas
National Register of Historic Places in Austin, Texas
Commercial buildings on the National Register of Historic Places in Texas
Recorded Texas Historic Landmarks
City of Austin Historic Landmarks
Grocery store buildings